The 2021–22 Saint Francis Red Flash men's basketball team represented Saint Francis University in the 2021–22 NCAA Division I men's basketball season. The Red Flash, led by eleventh-year head coach Rob Krimmel, played their home games at the DeGol Arena in Loretto, Pennsylvania as members of the Northeast Conference.

Previous season
In a season limited due to the ongoing COVID-19 pandemic, the Red Flash finished the 2020–21 season 6–16, 5–13 in NEC play to finish in a tie for ninth place. Due to complications caused by the pandemic, only the top four teams were eligible to participate in the NEC tournament.

Roster

Schedule and results
NEC COVID-19 policy provided that if a team could not play a conference game due to COVID-19 issues within its program, the game would be declared a forfeit and the other team would receive a conference win. However, wins related to COVID-19 do not count pursuant to NCAA policy.

|-
!colspan=12 style=| Non-conference regular season

|-
!colspan=12 style=| NEC regular season

|-
!colspan=9 style=| NEC tournament

Source

References

Saint Francis Red Flash men's basketball seasons
Saint Francis (PA)
Saint Francis
Saint Francis